Corliss Giles was an actor during the silent film era in the United States. He had starring roles including in the 1917 film Shirley Kaye, Voices in 1920, and The Mountain Woman in 1921. He also appeared in several theatrical productions.

In 1922 he was part of the Brownell Players and lived in New York City. In 1922 he filed for divorce from Frances Nielson Giles who he married in 1914.

Partieal filmography
Shirley Kaye (1917) as John Rowson
The Marionettes (film) (1918) as Pierre Vareine
The House of Glass (film) (1918) as Harvey Lake
In Search of a Sinner (1920) as Jeffrey
The Blue Pearl (1920) as Wilfred Scott
Voices (1920)
The Mountain Woman (1921), starring role

References

American male silent film actors
20th-century American male actors